Corrhenes crassicollis is a species of beetle in the family Cerambycidae. It was described by Francis Polkinghorne Pascoe in 1864. It is known from Australia. It contains the varietas Corrhenes crassicollis var. picta.

References

Corrhenes
Beetles described in 1864